Mingus at the Bohemia is a live album by Charles Mingus that was recorded at Café Bohemia in New York City on December 23, 1955. It was released in August 1956. Max Roach makes a guest appearance on one track. Other recordings from the same performance were released in 1964 under the title The Charles Mingus Quintet & Max Roach.

Mingus at the Bohemia has also been released under the title Chazz! and credited to The Charles Mingus Quintet.

Reception 
Allmusic awarded the album 4.5 stars, citing Mingus' standout bass playing and noting that "this is the first Mingus recording to feature mostly his own compositions."

Track listing 

Notes:
"Septemberly" is Mingus' compositional combination of "September in the Rain" by Dubin and Warren, and "Tenderly" by Gross and Lawrence. 
"All The Things You C#" is Mingus' compositional combination of "All The Things You Are" by Kern and Hammerstein, and "Prelude in C-sharp minor" by Rachmaninoff.
On some reissues, a brief spoken intro and false start are omitted from track 8 for a reduced length of 9:50.

Personnel 
 George Barrow - tenor saxophone
 Eddie Bert - trombone
 Mal Waldron - piano
 Charles Mingus - double bass (bass and cello on "Percussion Discussion") 
 Willie Jones - drums (except "Percussion Discussion")
 Max Roach - drums (on "Percussion Discussion")

Sources 
 Horst Weber, Gerd Filtg hi: Charles Mingus. Sein Leben, seine Musik, seine Schallplatten. Oreos, Gauting-Buchendorf, o.J., 
 Marcus A. Woelfle: Liner Notes zu Charles Mingus - 80th Birthday Celebration (Fantasy)
 Richard Cook & Brian Morton: The Penguin Guide To Jazz On CD; Penguin, London, 2002.
 Mal Waldron: Vinyl LP Liner Notes

References 

1955 albums
Charles Mingus albums
Debut Records live albums
Albums recorded at the Café Bohemia